Totten Prairie or Totten's Prairie was a small settlement in Cass Township, Fulton County, Illinois, just to the southeast of the present Smithfield, Illinois. It was named after William Totten, who was the first to settle there in 1823.  A small cemetery, called Totten Cemetery or Old Totten's Prairie Cemetery, still exists in that location.

The 1879 History of Fulton County, Illinois contains the following entry for William Totten:

References 

Ghost towns in Illinois
Populated places established in 1823
Populated places in Fulton County, Illinois